Dobkowice  (Dobkovychi) is a village in the administrative district of Gmina Chłopice, within Jarosław County, Subcarpathian Voivodeship, in south-eastern Poland.

The village has a population of 920.

References

Dobkowice